Donje Orešje is a village in Croatia. It is located in the Sveti Ivan Zelina municipality, which is part of the Zagreb County.

References

Populated places in Zagreb County